Gostanza da Libbiano is a 2000 Italian historical drama film written and directed by Paolo Benvenuti.

It is rigorously based on the original 1594 trial records of the eponymous nun accused of witchcraft in Tuscany.  It was entered into the main competition at the 2000 Locarno International Film Festival, in which it won the Special Jury Prize.

Cast    
Lucia Poli as Gostanza da Libbiano 
 Valentino Davanzati  as Monsignor Tommaso Roffia
 Renzo Cerrato as Father Dionigi da Costacciaro
 Paolo Spaziani as Father Mario Porcacchi da Castiglione
 Lele Biagi as  Vincenzo Viviani
 Nadia Capocchini as Lisabetta di Menicone

References

External links

2000 drama films
2000 films
Italian films based on actual events
Films directed by Paolo Benvenuti
Films set in the 1590s
Films set in Tuscany
Italian black-and-white films
Italian drama films
Witch hunting in fiction
2000s Italian films